Sa Linggo nAPO Sila (They Are Now On Sunday) is a Philippine musical-variety show that aired on ABS-CBN from November 6, 1988, to January 29, 1995, replaced by the first Talent Singing competition show Tawag ng Tanghalan from 1987–1988. The show aired live from the Studio 3 ABS-CBN Broadcasting Center in Quezon City. The show competed with GMA Supershow but when Eat Bulaga! moved to GMA Network from ABS-CBN, Sa Linggo nAPO Sila went its final airing after six years on January 29, 1995, and was replaced by ASAP. The ABS-CBN management later announced to launch another noontime show, unveiled as 'Sang Linggo nAPO Sila (They Are Now On All Week) to fill the void in ABS-CBN's weekday lineup.

Cast

APO Hiking Society
Danny Javier†
Jim Paredes
Boboy Garovillo

Co-hosts
Agot Isidro (1989–1995)
Amy Perez (1989–1995)
Ariel Rivera (1991–1995)
Bing Loyzaga (1989–1995)
Jun Encarnacion (1988–1995)
Lara Melissa de Leon (1988–1995)
Ilonah Jean (1989–1995)
Star Querubin
Ronniel Mendoza (1991–1994)
Rene Requiestas (1988–1993)
Solidgold Dancers
Street Boys
Adrenalin Dancers
Michael Segovia
Jam Morales (1988–1995) 
Katherine de Leon Vilar (1989–1995)

Segments
Cleene Premyo Sa Rolyo
Koleksyon OPM
Sarimanok Sweepstakes
Mr. Cupido
KaBarangay Dance Showdown
Star Quest (The Nationwide Campus Singing Competition: 1989–1995)

Critical response
In March 1992, Angela Stuart Santiago of the Manila Standard criticized the show's lack of professionalism, stating that "Jim, Danny, and Boboy rarely know the lyrics of the songs they sing; often their numbers with guests and female co-hosts turn out like amateur karaoke affairs, out of tune and out of synch [sic]."

See also
'Sang Linggo nAPO Sila
List of programs broadcast by ABS-CBN

References

1980s Philippine television series
1990s Philippine television series
1988 Philippine television series debuts
1995 Philippine television series endings
ABS-CBN original programming
Filipino-language television shows
Philippine variety television shows